Sheila Ribeiro  (born March 25, 1973) is an artist considered to be post-convergent, working in an interdependent, multivectorial and extradisciplinary networked media ecosystem, expressed in an evaporated and remixed materiality. Involved with digital and body arts, as well as conceptual fashion, technology and communication and cultural studies. Currently lives between Salvador, Montreal and Rome.

Career 
Ribeiro is known for her fragmented, fantastical work, treating contemporary power dynamics, migration codes, digital cognition and pop fashion aesthetics, as well as for her multipurpose extra-disciplinary way of working through installations, performances, films, fashion shoots, dance pieces on stage, on camera, on the street.

She has been an artist since 1992 and has also been a consultant on transdisciplinarity, contemporary arts and cultures in the development of  new epistemologies.

Performances and artworks 
 2021 Nem National Nem Geographic
 2016 Codex
 2014 #sheilaribeiro sampleado 
 2014 Uma Risada te Sepultará 
 2012 Chamando ela sem eles 
 2011 Your Beautiful Eyes
 2011 Imitanting Jimmie Durham 
 2010 Organic Totem 
 2007 Flesh Organizer 
 2003 Show
 2002 Diet Subtitles
 2000 Flea Market: we are used and cheap
 1999 Marché aux puces, nous sommes usagés et pas chers
 1992 Food in the trash (Comida no lixo)

Collaborations
 2016 Codex Mundo Algodão, with Alejandro Ahmed
 2016 Codex Sangue de Barata, with Wagner Schwartz
 2015 Tira meu Fôlego, with Elisa Othake
 2014 Outros Usuários, with Marcos Moraes 
 2013 Lugar pra ficar em pé | Almost, with Núcleo do Dirceu
 2012 Receitas e Dúvidas, with Wagner Schwartz and Gustavo Bittencourt
 2009 Um dente chamado Bico, with Jorge Alencar
 2006 Sandmann, with Massimo Canevacci
 2005 V I P, at 100 rencontres, Benoît Lachambre
 2005 Pay Here, at 100 rencontres, Benoît Lachambre
 2004 Killing an Arab, with Joe Hiscott
 2003 The first REAL human clone, at 100 rencontres, Benoît Lachambre
 2003 Madame PIPI, at 100 rencontres, Benoît Lachambre
 2003 Vacances, at 100 rencontres, Benoît Lachambre
 2000 Flea Market, we are used and cheap, with Sophie Deraspe

Publications
 2015 Chamando Ela

Films 
 2006 Rechercher Victor Pellerin (Sophie Deraspe)
 2004 The Telephone Eulogies (Joe Hiscott)

Awards 
 2014 Prêmio APCA 2014 – Projeto 7x7 – categoria "Iniciativa em Dança", Associação Paulista de Críticos de Arte
 2014 Legado – Rumos Itaú Cultural Dança #sampleado, Itaú Cultural 
 2014 Prêmio APCA 2014 – Tira meu fôlego – categoria elenco, Associação Paulista de Críticos de Arte

References

External links 
 Chamando ela
 Enciclopédia Itaú Cultural 
 Discoreografia – Música, Dança e Blá, Blá, Blá – programa 8 

1973 births
Living people
Brazilian contemporary artists
Canadian contemporary artists
Canadian digital artists
Women digital artists
Body art
21st-century Canadian women artists